Malcolm Grow Medical Clinics and Surgery Center is a United States Air Force medical treatment facility located on Joint Base Andrews Maryland and operated by the 11th Medical Group. The original facility designated U.S.A.F. Hospital Andrews opened in 1958 and was redesignated Malcolm Grow U.S.A.F. Medical Center in 1962. It is named after Major General (Dr.) Malcolm C. Grow, the first Surgeon General of the United States Air Force.

References

External links

 Malcolm Grow Medical Clinic

1958 establishments in Maryland
Buildings and structures in Prince George's County, Maryland
Hospitals established in 1958
Hospitals in Maryland
Military hospitals in the United States
Medical installations of the United States Air Force